George Barnes Grigsby (December 2, 1874 – May 9, 1962) was a delegate to the United States House of Representatives from the Territory of Alaska.

Early life and education
He was born in Sioux Falls, Dakota (now South Dakota), and was a son of Fannie (Kingsbury) Grigsby and Melvin Grigsby, a prominent South Dakota political and military leader. His siblings included Sioux K. Grigsby and John T. Grigsby, both of whom served as South Dakota's lieutenant governor.  Grigsby attended the public schools, State University in Vermillion, South Dakota, and Sioux Falls University. He studied law, was admitted to the bar in 1896, and commenced practice in Sioux Falls, South Dakota.

Career
George Grigsby was a delegate to the state Democratic convention in 1896. During the Spanish–American War, he served as a lieutenant in the Third Regiment, United States Volunteer Cavalry. He moved to Nome, Alaska, in 1902. He was an assistant United States attorney from 1902 to 1908 and a United States attorney from 1908 to 1910. He was the city attorney of Nome in 1911 and the mayor in 1914. In 1915, he was a member of the board of commissioners for the promotion of uniform legislation. He was elected the first attorney general in 1916, and he resigned in 1919.

He presented his credentials as a Democratic Delegate-elect to the Sixty-sixth Congress to fill the vacancy caused by the death of Charles A. Sulzer. He served from June 3, 1920, to March 1, 1921, when he was succeeded by James Wickersham, who had contested the election of Charles Sulzer in the first instance and contested against George Grigsby. He was a delegate to the Democratic National Convention in 1920 and 1924. He engaged in the practice of law in Ketchikan, Juneau, and Anchorage, Alaska.

Death
He died on May 9, 1962, in Santa Rosa, California. He was interred in Golden Gate National Cemetery in San Bruno, California.

Sources

1874 births
1962 deaths
Delegates to the United States House of Representatives from Alaska Territory
20th-century American politicians
Alaska Attorneys General
Alaska Democrats
Democratic Party members of the United States House of Representatives from Alaska
Mayors of places in Alaska
University of Sioux Falls people
Politicians from Sioux Falls, South Dakota
People from Nome, Alaska
People from Ketchikan Gateway Borough, Alaska
Politicians from Juneau, Alaska
Politicians from Anchorage, Alaska
United States Army officers
American military personnel of the Spanish–American War
Burials at Golden Gate National Cemetery
Military personnel from Anchorage, Alaska
Military personnel from South Dakota
Lawyers from Anchorage, Alaska
South Dakota lawyers
Members of the United States House of Representatives removed by contest